The European Radicals in Sri Lanka consisted of a group of Europeans in the British colony of Ceylon who supported radical politics and opposed the colonial system prevailing on the island. They were anti-imperialist in their political outlook and worked with Sri Lankan activists to assist the colony in achieving independence from British colonial rule. The group held a disproportionate amount of influence relative to their size, and most were radical activists in their home countries who had married Sri Lankan activists and revolutionary politicians; being active in the Lanka Sama Samaja Party, the Communist Party of Sri Lanka and the Viplavakari Lanka Sama Samaja Party. Several attempts were made at deporting them by the colonial government, most notably the Australian ex-planter Mark Anthony Bracegirdle, along with Rhoda Miller de Silva, Jeanne Hoban Moonesinghe and Maud Keuneman. Other notable European Radicals included Doreen Young Wickremasinghe, who became a MP, Edith Gyömrői Ludowyk and Hedi Keuneman.

Anti-imperialism in Asia
Anti-racism in Asia
Allies (social justice)
European diaspora in Sri Lanka
Sri Lankan politicians